{{Album reviews
| rev1 = Allmusic 
| rev1score = <ref name=amg>McCall, Michael, [ "Review: In Search of a Song"], AllMusic</ref>
|rev2 = Christgau's Record Guide|rev2Score = A
| rev3 = Rolling Stone 
| rev3score = (favorable)
| noprose = yes}}In Search of a Song is a 1971 album by country singer and songwriter, Tom T. Hall.  The album includes eleven songs based on Hall's observations of rural life.  It became a number eight top country album and the opening track, "The Year That Clayton Delaney Died" became a number one country single.

 History In Search of a Song'' was released amid Hall's years with Mercury Records (1969–1977) during which he released one or more albums each year (see Tom T. Hall discography).  It is the first full album to result from one of Hall's "song-hunting" trips to Kentucky.  Hall was known to make periodic visits to rural Kentucky.  He didn't actually write songs on these trips so much as take notes and gather raw material that he would later write about.  He typically traveled backroads by car, sometimes with a photographer, to find inspiration by observing and visiting with the common people of his home state. On this particular trip, Hall traveled with music journalist William "Bill" Neuel Littleton of Nashville, TN. Littleton took the photographs that appear on the album's front and back cover, subsequently writing the album's liner notes.

Track listing 
All songs by Tom T. Hall
 "The Year That Clayton Delaney Died" – 2:42
 "Who's Gonna Feed Them Hogs" – 2:35
 "Trip to Hyden" – 2:52
 "Tulsa Telephone Book" – 2:21
 "It Sure Can Get Cold in Des Moines" – 2:53
 "The Little Lady Preacher" – 2:53
 "L.A. Blues" – 2:40
 "Kentucky, February 27, 1971" – 3:16
 "A Million Miles to the City" – 2:51
 "Second Handed Flowers" – 2:55
 "Ramona's Revenge" – 2:53

Personnel

Musicians
 Tom T. Hall – guitar, vocals
 Jerry Kennedy – guitar, dobro, sitar
 Ray Edenton – guitar
 Chip Young – guitar
 Harold Bradley – six-string bass guitar, banjo
 Pete Drake – pedal steel guitar, dobro
 Bob Moore – bass
 Buddy Harman – drums
 Hargus "Pig" Robbins – piano
 George Tidwell – trumpet
 Charlie McCoy – harmonica, vibes

Production
 Jerry Kennedy – Producer
 Recorded May 1971, Mercury Custom Recording Studio, Nashville, Tennessee, except tracks 1 & 9, recorded March 26, 1971

Charts

Releases

References 

1971 albums
Tom T. Hall albums
Albums produced by Jerry Kennedy
Mercury Records albums
Hip-O Records albums
Hux Records albums